James Willmer Lawson (March 11, 1902 – January 3, 1989) was an American football end and placekicker who played one season with the New York Yankees of the National Football League (NFL). Lawson played college football for the Stanford football team of Stanford University. He was a consensus first-team All-American in 1924. He was also a member of the Los Angeles Wildcats of the American Football League.

Early years and college career
Lawson attended Long Beach Polytechnic High School in Long Beach, California.

He was Stanford University's first All-American, a consensus selection, in 1924. The 1924 Stanford football team went 7-1-1 and appeared in the 1925 Rose Bowl against Notre Dame in a losing effort. He was inducted into the Stanford Athletic Hall of Fame.

Professional career
Lawson kicked four extra points and two field goals for the Los Angeles Wildcats in 1926.

References

External links
Just Sports Stats

1902 births
1989 deaths
American football ends
Los Angeles Wildcats players
New York Yankees (NFL) players
Stanford Cardinal football players
All-American college football players
People from Jefferson County, Indiana
Players of American football from Long Beach, California
Long Beach Polytechnic High School alumni